Zale squamularis, the gray-banded zale, is a moth of the family Noctuidae. The species was first described by Dru Drury in 1773. It is found in the US from Ohio to Long Island, south to Florida and Texas.

The wingspan is about 38 mm. There are two to three generations in New Jersey.

The larvae feed on pitch pine, pond pine and probably other hard pines. It prefers mature needles.

References

External links
"Gray-banded Zale (Zale squamularis)". Forest Pests. Archived October 31, 2007. With larval stage info.

Catocalinae
Moths described in 1773